Lucanus elaphus, the giant stag beetle, is a beetle of the family Lucanidae native to eastern North America. They are sometimes kept as pets.

Etymology
Elaphus in Greek means "deer".  Compare with the Red Deer (Cervus elaphus), 'cervus' meaning 'deer' in Latin.

Gallery

References

elaphus
Beetles described in 1775
Taxa named by Johan Christian Fabricius
Beetles of the United States